Rafael Pires Monteiro (born 23 June 1989), known simply as Rafael, is a Brazilian footballer who plays as a goalkeeper for São Paulo.

Club career
Rafael joined the youth ranks of Cruzeiro in 2002 and received his first call up to the first team squad six years later. He made his professional debut on 30 January 2010, in a Campeonato Mineiro 3–0 defeat to Ipatinga. On 4 December 2011, he was in the starting lineup in one of Cruzeiro's most famed Clássico Mineiro wins, in which they beat rivals Atlético Mineiro 6–1 in the last round of that year's Campeonato Brasileiro Série A and avoided relegation.

During Cruzeiro's 2016 Campeonato Brasileiro Série A campaign, Rafael served as the main goalkeeper, while the first choice and club captain Fábio recovered from a long-term injury. During the first months of 2017, he and Fábio battled for the spot, with Rafael starting in most of the 2017 Campeonato Mineiro matches.

On 3 March 2020, Rafael joined Atlético Mineiro on a three-year deal.

On 8 December 2022, Rafael signed a three-year deal with São Paulo.

Career statistics

Honours
Cruzeiro
Campeonato Brasileiro Série A: 2013, 2014
Copa do Brasil: 2017, 2018
Campeonato Mineiro: 2009, 2011, 2014, 2018, 2019

Atlético Mineiro
Campeonato Brasileiro Série A: 2021
Copa do Brasil: 2021
Campeonato Mineiro: 2020, 2021, 2022
Supercopa do Brasil: 2022

Brazil U20
South American Youth Championship: 2009

References

External links

1989 births
Living people
Sportspeople from Minas Gerais
Brazilian footballers
Association football goalkeepers
Cruzeiro Esporte Clube players
Clube Atlético Mineiro players
São Paulo FC players
Campeonato Brasileiro Série A players
Brazil youth international footballers
Brazil under-20 international footballers